Parna Pethe is an Indian film & theatre actress who has appeared in many Marathi films and experimental plays.

Early life 
Parna was born and raised in Pune. She studied at Abhinava Vidyalaya School and graduated from Fergusson College, Pune. She started acting while she was studying at Fergusson. She has been a Bharatnatyam dancer since she was 8.

Personal life
She dated Alok Rajwade for 6 years before tying the knot, on 29 February 2016. They had a court marriage at Mangal Karyalay, Pune.

Career
Pethe was one of the founding members of Natak Company, in 2008. She was also part of the theatre troupe, Aasakta Kalamanch. In 2014,she appeared in Rama Madhav, in which she played the titular character along with Alok Rajwade. In 2016, she appeared in the movie YZ. She replaced Sakhi Gokhale in the famous play, Amar Photo Studio in 2018. In 2019, she was part of an online short film series, titled Safe Journeys, opposite Suvrat Joshi. She would be seen next in Medium Spicy, directed by Mohit Takalkar.  Pethe is also the curator of Kaan Drushti, a series of theatre related talks by Natak Company. In 2022, she started sharing the stage with her father Atul Pethe for the first time in a play called Adlay Ka…? directed by Nipun Dharmadhikari.

Films

Theatre

References

External links
 

1990 births
Living people
Marathi actors
People from Pune
Actresses in Marathi cinema
Indian film actresses
Indian theatre people
Indian theatre directors